In mathematics, a bijection, also known as a bijective function, one-to-one correspondence, or invertible function, is a function between the elements of two sets, where each element of one set is paired with exactly one element of the other set, and each element of the other set is paired with exactly one element of the first set; there are no unpaired elements between the two sets. In mathematical terms, a bijective function  is a one-to-one (injective) and onto (surjective) mapping of a set X to a set Y. The term one-to-one correspondence must not be confused with one-to-one function (an injective function; see figures).

A bijection from the set X to the set Y has an inverse function from Y to X.  If X and Y are finite sets, then the existence of a bijection means they have the same number of elements. For infinite sets, the picture is more complicated, leading to the concept of cardinal number—a way to distinguish the various sizes of infinite sets.

A bijective function from a set to itself is also called a permutation, and the set of all permutations of a set forms the symmetric group.

Bijective functions are essential to many areas of mathematics including the definitions of isomorphisms, homeomorphisms, diffeomorphisms, permutation groups, and projective maps.

Definition

For a pairing between X and Y (where Y need not be different from X) to be a bijection, four properties must hold:
 each element of X must be paired with at least one element of Y,
 no element of X may be paired with more than one element of Y,
 each element of Y must be paired with at least one element of X, and
 no element of Y may be paired with more than one element of X.

Satisfying properties (1) and (2) means that a pairing is a function with domain X. It is more common to see properties (1) and (2) written as a single statement: Every element of X is paired with exactly one element of Y. Functions which satisfy property (3) are said to be "onto Y " and are called surjections (or surjective functions). Functions which satisfy property (4) are said to be "one-to-one functions" and are called injections (or injective functions). With this terminology, a bijection is a function which is both a surjection and an injection, or using other words, a bijection is a function which is both "one-to-one" and "onto".

Bijections are sometimes denoted by a two-headed rightwards arrow with tail, as in f : X ⤖ Y. This symbol is a combination of the two-headed rightwards arrow, sometimes used to denote surjections, and the rightwards arrow with a barbed tail, sometimes used to denote injections.

Examples

Batting line-up of a baseball or cricket team
Consider the batting line-up of a baseball or cricket team (or any list of all the players of any sports team where every player holds a specific spot in a line-up). The set X will be the players on the team (of size nine in the case of baseball) and the set Y will be the positions in the batting order (1st, 2nd, 3rd, etc.) The "pairing" is given by which player is in what position in this order. Property (1) is satisfied since each player is somewhere in the list. Property (2) is satisfied since no player bats in two (or more) positions in the order. Property (3) says that for each position in the order, there is some player batting in that position and property (4) states that two or more players are never batting in the same position in the list.

Seats and students of a classroom
In a classroom there are a certain number of seats. A bunch of students enter the room and the instructor asks them to be seated. After a quick look around the room, the instructor declares that there is a bijection between the set of students and the set of seats, where each student is paired with the seat they are sitting in. What the instructor observed in order to reach this conclusion was that:
 Every student was in a seat (there was no one standing),
 No student was in more than one seat,
 Every seat had someone sitting there (there were no empty seats), and
 No seat had more than one student in it. 
The instructor was able to conclude that there were just as many seats as there were students, without having to count either set.

More mathematical examples

 For any set X, the identity function 1X: X → X, 1X(x) = x is bijective.
 The function f: R → R, f(x) = 2x + 1 is bijective, since for each y there is a unique x = (y − 1)/2 such that f(x) = y. More generally, any linear function over the reals, f: R → R, f(x) = ax + b (where a is non-zero) is a bijection. Each real number y is obtained from (or paired with) the real number x = (y − b)/a.
 The function f: R → (−π/2, π/2), given by f(x) = arctan(x) is bijective, since each real number x is paired with exactly one angle y in the interval (−π/2, π/2) so that tan(y) = x (that is, y = arctan(x)). If the codomain  (−π/2, π/2) was made larger to include an integer multiple of π/2, then this function would no longer be onto (surjective), since there is no real number which could be paired with the multiple of π/2 by this arctan function.
 The exponential function, g: R → R, g(x) = ex, is not bijective: for instance, there is no x in R such that g(x) = −1, showing that g is not onto (surjective). However, if the codomain is restricted to the positive real numbers , then g would be bijective; its inverse (see below) is the natural logarithm function ln.
 The function h: R → R+, h(x) = x2 is not bijective: for instance, h(−1) = h(1) = 1, showing that h is not one-to-one (injective).
By Cantor-Bernstein-Schröder theorem, given any two sets X and Y, and two injective functions f: X → Y and g: Y → X, there exists a bijective function h: X → Y.

Inverses
A bijection f with domain X (indicated by f: X → Y in functional notation) also defines a converse relation starting in Y and going to X (by turning the arrows around). The process of "turning the arrows around" for an arbitrary function does not, in general, yield a function, but properties (3) and (4) of a bijection say that this inverse relation is a function with domain Y. Moreover, properties (1) and (2) then say that this inverse function is a surjection and an injection, that is, the inverse function exists and is also a bijection. Functions that have inverse functions are said to be invertible. A function is invertible if and only if it is a bijection.

Stated in concise mathematical notation, a function f: X → Y is bijective if and only if it satisfies the condition
for every y in Y there is a unique x in X with y = f(x).

Continuing with the baseball batting line-up example, the function that is being defined takes as input the name of one of the players and outputs the position of that player in the batting order. Since this function is a bijection, it has an inverse function which takes as input a position in the batting order and outputs the player who will be batting in that position.

Composition

Conversely, if the composition  of two functions is bijective, it only follows that f is injective and g is surjective.

Cardinality
If X and Y are finite sets, then there exists a bijection between the two sets X and Y if and only if X and Y have the same number of elements. Indeed, in axiomatic set theory, this is taken as the definition of "same number of elements" (equinumerosity), and generalising this definition to infinite sets leads to the concept of cardinal number, a way to distinguish the various sizes of infinite sets.

Properties 
 A function f: R → R is bijective if and only if its graph meets every horizontal and vertical line exactly once.
 If X is a set, then the bijective functions from X to itself, together with the operation of functional composition (∘), form a group, the symmetric group of X, which is denoted variously by S(X), SX, or X! (X factorial).
 Bijections preserve cardinalities of sets: for a subset A of the domain with cardinality |A| and subset B of the codomain with cardinality |B|, one has the following equalities:
|f(A)| = |A| and |f−1(B)| = |B|.
If X and Y are finite sets with the same cardinality, and f: X → Y, then the following are equivalent:
 f is a bijection.
 f is a surjection.
 f is an injection.
For a finite set S, there is a bijection between the set of possible total orderings of the elements and the set of bijections from S to S.  That is to say, the number of permutations of elements of S is the same as the number of total orderings of that set—namely, n!.

Category theory
Bijections are precisely the isomorphisms in the category Set of sets and set functions.  However, the bijections are not always the isomorphisms for more complex categories.  For example, in the category Grp of groups, the morphisms must be homomorphisms since they must preserve the group structure, so the isomorphisms are group isomorphisms which are bijective homomorphisms.

Generalization to partial functions
The notion of one-to-one correspondence generalizes to partial functions, where they are called partial bijections, although partial bijections are only required to be injective. The reason for this relaxation is that a (proper) partial function is already undefined for a portion of its domain; thus there is no compelling reason to constrain its inverse to be a total function, i.e. defined everywhere on its domain. The set of all partial bijections on a given base set is called the symmetric inverse semigroup.

Another way of defining the same notion is to say that a partial bijection from A to B is any relation 
R (which turns out to be a partial function) with the property that R is the graph of a bijection f:A′→B′, where A′ is a subset of A and B′ is a subset of B.

When the partial bijection is on the same set, it is sometimes called a one-to-one partial transformation. An example is the Möbius transformation simply defined on the complex plane, rather than its completion to the extended complex plane.

Gallery

See also

 Ax–Grothendieck theorem
 Bijection, injection and surjection
 Bijective numeration
 Bijective proof
 Category theory
 Multivalued function

Notes

References
This topic is a basic concept in set theory and can be found in any text which includes an introduction to set theory. Almost all texts that deal with an introduction to writing proofs will include a section on set theory, so the topic may be found in any of these:

External links

 
 
 Earliest Uses of Some of the Words of Mathematics: entry on Injection, Surjection and Bijection has the history of Injection and related terms.

Functions and mappings
Basic concepts in set theory
Mathematical relations
Types of functions